The Mikoyan-Gurevich MiG-19 (NATO reporting name: Farmer) is a Soviet second generation, single-seat, twinjet fighter aircraft, the world's first mass-produced supersonic aircraft. It was the first Soviet production aircraft capable of supersonic speeds in level flight. A comparable U.S. "Century Series" fighter was the North American F-100 Super Sabre, although the MiG-19 primarily fought against the more modern McDonnell Douglas F-4 Phantom II and Republic F-105 Thunderchief over North Vietnam. This aircraft was originally used by the Soviet Union but it was later used by the People's Liberation Army Air Force.

Design and development
In 1950 the Mikoyan-Gurevich (MiG) design bureau (also known as OKB-155) began work on a new fighter aircraft, intended to have a greater range than the existing MiG-15 and MiG-17 aircraft, and capable of reaching supersonic speeds in level flight. MiG chose to use two of the new Mikulin AM-5 axial jet engines (a scaled-down version of the Mikulin AM-3 that powered the Tupolev Tu-16 bomber) for its new fighter. As a test bed for the new engine, OKB-155 was authorised on 20 April 1951 to convert one of the prototype MiG-17s, replacing the single Klimov VK-1 engine with two  AM-5s (later replaced by  AM-5As), with the testbed, designated SM-1 (or I-340), flying late in 1951. While the SM-1 was a useful testbed, its performance was less than expected, and first resulted in an afterburner being designed for the AM-5, resulting in the AM-5F (reaching  with reheat).

While the SM-1 was a test bed, the SM-2 (or I-360) was intended as the required supersonic escort fighter, with work authorised on 10 August 1951. The SM-2 was a twin-engined, mid-winged aircraft. Its thin wings, which had been designed at TsAGI, the Soviet Central Aerohydrodynamic Institute, for supersonic flight were swept back at an angle of 55 degrees and had a single wing fence on each side. Unusually, a T-tail was fitted. Armament was two Nudelman N-37 37-mm cannon located in the leading edge of the aircraft's wings, near the wing roots - the guns had been moved compared to those in the MiG-15 and -17 to avoid ingestion of gun blast gases causing surging of the aircraft's engines. The first SM-2, the SM-2/1 was sent to the Letno-Issledovatel'skiy Institut (en:flight research institute) (LII) in April 1952 for testing, and was flown for the first time on 24 May 1952, with test pilot G. A. Sedov at the aircraft's controls. With the un-reheated AM-5A engines, the SM-2 could not exceed the speed of sound in level flight, so reheated AM-5F engines were substituted. While the new engines improved performance, the aircraft was found to have handling problems, particularly at high angles of attack, where the aircraft was prone to spinning. To solve these problems the aircraft's horizontal tail was lowered, with other changes including moving the aircraft's airbrakes and deepening the wing fences, with the modifications causing the aircraft to be redesignated SM-2A and then SM-2B.

When fitted with the new engines, the SM-2B became the SM-9, first flying in this form on 5 January 1954. The SM-9's performance impressed the Soviet authorities, and it was ordered into production as the MiG-19 on 17 February 1954, despite the fact that factory testing had only just started.

The rush to get the MiG-19 into service resulted in initial production aircraft having a number of serious problems. The type suffered a number of in-flight explosions, eventually traced to poor insulation between the aircraft's engines and fuel tanks in the rear fuselage - overheating of these tanks could cause fuel explosions. This was eventually partly solved by fitting a metal heat shield between the engines and the tanks. The aircraft's elevators proved ineffective at supersonic speeds, and an all-moving slab tail was tested by the second and third SM-9 prototypes, and later included in the major production type, the MiG-19S, which also featured an improved armament.

At the same time that the daylight escort fighter was developed from the SM-2 and SM-9 into the MiG-19 and MiG-19S, work went on in parallel to design and build a radar-equipped all-weather fighter, with the first prototype SM-7/1 flying for the first time on 28 August 1954. This prototype had a similar airframe to the first SM-9, including the conventional fixed horizontal tail, with the second and third SM-7s introducing similar changes to those tested on the SM-9 prototypes, including the slab tail. The all weather fighter entered production as the MiG-19P in 1955. Major differences from the MiG-19S included RP-1 Izumrud radar in the aircraft's nose, with small radomes in the centre and on the top lip of the air intake and an armament of two cannon in the aircraft's wing roots. From 1957, production of all weather fighters switched to the missile equipped MiG-19PM, with an armament of four K-5M air-to-air missiles, with the cannon removed.

In 1955, following American introduction of high-altitude reconnaissance balloons and overflights by British Canberra aircraft, which could not be intercepted by existing aircraft, together with intelligence reports of the development of the Lockheed U-2 with an even greater ceiling, development began on a specialist high-altitude version of the MiG-19, the MiG-19SV, which entered limited production. This had more powerful engines and was lightened, with seatback armour and one of the guns removed, while flap settings were adjusted to give greater lift at higher altitudes and a new pressure suit was introduced.

Operational history

Soviet Union
Deliveries of the new fighter to the Soviet Air Forces (VVS) began in June 1955, with the type being publicly unveiled on 3 July that year, when 48 MiG-19s took part in a flypast during an airshow at Tushino Airfield, Moscow.

During their service with Soviet Anti-Air Defense and in East Germany, MiG-19s were involved in multiple interceptions of Western reconnaissance aircraft. The first documented encounter with a Lockheed U-2 took place in the autumn of 1957. The MiG-19 pilot reported seeing the aircraft, but could not make up the  difference in altitude. When Francis Gary Powers's U-2 was shot down in the 1960 incident, one pursuing MiG-19P was also hit by the salvo of S-75 Dvina (NATO: SA-2 "Guideline") missiles, killing the pilot Sergei Safronov. In a highly controversial incident, on 1 July 1960, a MiG-19 shot down an RB-47H (S/N 53-4281) reconnaissance aircraft in international airspace over the Arctic Circle with four of the crew killed and two captured by the Soviets (they were released in 1961). In another incident, on 28 January 1964, a MiG-19 shot down a T-39 Sabreliner which had strayed into East German airspace while on a training mission; all three crewmembers were killed.

East Asia

China
The first use and loss of a U.S. fighter to a MiG-19 (J-6) was in 1965 when a USAF Lockheed F-104 Starfighter piloted by Captain Philip E. Smith was attacked by a PLAAF aircraft over Hainan Island. His Starfighter took cannon fire which damaged a portion of his wing and missile mount. Smith gave chase and did receive missile tone on the MiG but, within a millisecond of pressing his missile firing button, his Starfighter lost all power. He ejected and was captured. Smith was held prisoner until released on 15 March 1973, due to improving US-China relations following U.S. President Richard Nixon's visit to China in 1972.

Vietnam 
The Vietnam People's Air Force (VPAF) began receiving the MiG-19 at the end of Operation Rolling Thunder, which ended in 1968. Despite their limited numbers, MiG-19s were involved in extensive combat during Operations Linebacker and Linebacker 2. The VPAF claimed seven victories over U.S. aircraft using the MiG-19, all of which were F-4 Phantom IIs. The MiG-19 was tested by U.S. pilots in the United States in 1969 after receiving an F-6 (J-6 export model) from Pakistan. In addition to finding the aircraft to have a good canopy allowing good visibility for the pilot, along with three hard-hitting 30mm cannons, U.S. pilots found the MiG-19 (J-6/F-6) to be an excellent fighter, "like the MiG-17, it could easily out-turn the Phantom...and could out-accelerate the F-4 out to Mach 1.2, but was slower than the MiG-21.".  However, the MiG-19's strongest fault was its extremely short range, as one U.S. test pilot remarked, "after going in full after-burner at low altitude for five minutes, the MiG driver will be looking for a place to land!"  This, combined with the aircraft's twin engines, which were difficult to maintain, made the MiG-19 unpopular with North Vietnamese pilots.

The North Vietnamese government decided in early 1969 to strengthen its air defenses by creating a third jet fighter unit; the 925th Fighter Regiment. This unit would consist of late model MiG-17s and the newly acquired MiG-19s (nearly all of which were Shenyang J-6s from the People's Republic of China (PRC)). The regiment was established at Yen Bai, and by April 1969, nine combat-rated MiG-19 pilots were posted for combat duty. While some of North Vietnam's MiG-17s and all of their MiG-21s were supplied by the Soviet Union, the MiG-19s (J-6 models) were supplied by the PRC, which seldom exceeded 54 MiG-19s in number.

The MiG-19 lacked mounts for air-to-air missiles but it had the one advantage over the early model F-4 Phantom II: it was armed with cannons. VPAF MiG-19s had three 30 mm cannons which "were notable for their large muzzle flash" when fired. The aircraft were loaded with 90 rounds per cannon, giving approximately six seconds of firing time. This contrasted to a U.S. 20 mm cannon such as the M61 Vulcan which would deliver  of metal.

US sources claim that 10 VPAF MiG-19s were lost in aerial combat. On 2 June 1972 a MiG-19 was the first recorded jet fighter to be shot down in aerial combat by cannon fire at supersonic speeds, by a USAF F-4 Phantom flown by Phil Handley. According to the VPAF, from 1965 to 1972, North Vietnamese MiG-19s shot down 13 enemy aircraft and helicopters, while five MiG-19s were lost (four shot down by enemy aircraft and one by friendly fire) and one pilot was killed.

Air-to-air victories
The following are Chinese and Vietnamese air-to-air kills, confirmed by US sources; all were achieved with 30 mm cannon shells.

Middle East

Egypt
One of the first Egyptian MiG-19 units was the 15th Air Brigade, consisting of Nos 20 and 21 Squadrons, which became operational at Fayid with a forward location at Milayz in the early 1960s.

In 1962, Egyptian MiG-19s saw some action in the ground-attack role during the North Yemen Civil War. The first reported air combat in the Middle East with the MiG-19 happened on 29 November 1966 when an Israeli Air Force (IAF) Dassault Mirage III shot down two Egyptian MiG-19s which were trying to intercept an Israeli reconnaissance Piper J-3 Cub in Israeli airspace. The first MiG was destroyed with a R.530 radar-guided missile fired from less than a mile away, marking the first aerial kill for the French-made missile. The second MiG-19 was dispatched with cannon fire.

Around 80 MiG-19s were in service with Egypt during the Six-Day War in June 1967, but more than half of them were destroyed on the ground during the opening Israeli airstrikes of Operation Focus. Israeli pilots, however, did find the MiG-19 a potentially dangerous adversary because of its performance, maneuverability, and heavy armament.

Following the war, the Egyptians reorganized their surviving MiG-19 fleet, and assigned them to the air defense of Egypt's interior. The Soviet Union did not supply Egypt with any additional MiG-19s as replacements for those destroyed in the Six-Day War, but Egypt might have received some from Syria and Iraq, so that by the end of 1968 there were more than 80 MiG-19s in service with the Egyptian Air Force. The aircraft also saw combat during the War of Attrition; in one engagement on 19 May 1969, a MiG-19 engaged two Israeli Mirages, shooting down one with cannon fire while the other escaped. Egypt had around 60 MiG-19s in service during the Yom Kippur War of 1973 in which they served as close air support aircraft.

Iraq
Iraq obtained some MiG-19S fighters in the early 1960s, but later sold most of them (a couple remaining in local museums), though a few remaining airframes did see some action against the Kurds in the 1960s.

Syria

The Syrian Air Force used MiG-19s in the Yemen War.

North Korea 
North Korea received an unknown number of MiG-19S from the Soviet Union following the signing of a mutual assistance treaty in 1961. Thirty of these aircraft may have been sold to Iraq in 1983. At least 100 F-6s were acquired from China in 1988–89. As of April 2002, the Korean People's Army Air and Anti-Air Force was reportedly operating about 100 Shenyang J-6 and/or MiG 19s.

Variants

Production aircraft designations

Data from::
MiG-19 (NATO reporting name - "Farmer-A"; OKB- SM-9/1)
First production version. Conventional tail assembly with elevators attached to fixed horizontal stabiliser and armed with three 23 mm NR-23 cannon.
MiG-19P (NATO - "Farmer-B"; OKB - SM-7)
Version equipped with RP-1 Izumrud radar in the nose and armed with two 23 mm NR-23 (later two 30 mm NR-30) cannons in the wings. Had provision for an unguided rocket pack under each wing, elongated tailfin fillet, all-moving tailplane, third airbrake added behind the ventral fin. Vympel K-13 (AA-2 'Atoll') air-to-air missile (AAM) capability was added late in its service life; entered production in 1955.
MiG-19PF
Single-seat radar-equipped, all-weather interceptor fighter aircraft; built in small numbers.
MiG-19PG
MiG-19P equipped with the Gorizont-1 ground control datalink.
MiG-19PM (NATO - "Farmer-E")
Variant with removed cannons, armed with four Kaliningrad K-5M (NATO: AA-1 "Alkali") beam-riding missiles. Entered production in 1957.
MiG-19PML
MiG-19PM with Lazur ground control datalink.
MiG-19PU
Rocket pack fit similar to MiG-19SU.
MiG-19PT
A single MiG-19P equipped to carry Vympel K-13 (NATO: AA-2 "Atoll") missiles.
MiG-19PU
MiG-19R
Reconnaissance version of the MiG-19S with cameras replacing the nose cannon and powered by uprated RD-9BF-1 engines.
MiG-19S (NATO - "Farmer-C"; OKB - SM-9/3)
Improved day fighter with all-moving slab tail. Equipped with Svod long-range navigation receiver and armed with three 30 mm NR-30 cannons. Had provisions for an ORO-32K rocket unguided rocket pack or a FAB-250 bomb under each wing, and from 1957 modified to allow four rocket pods to be carried. Entered production in 1956.
MiG-19SF
Late production MiG-19S powered by the same uprated RD-9BF-1 engines as the MiG-19R.
MiG-19SV
High-altitude version for intercepting reconnaissance balloons, reached  on 6 December 1956.
MiG-19SMK
two missile guidance testbeds for the K-10S cruise missile system.
MiG-19SVK
MiG-19SV with a new wing, small increase in altitude above MiG-19SV; did not warrant production.
MiG-19SU (OKB SM-50)
High-altitude version to intercept the Lockheed U-2, equipped with a self-contained liquid-fuel booster rocket pack; appears to have been abandoned because of inability to control the aircraft at very high altitudes and the aircraft's tendency to enter supersonic spins.
MiG-19M
Target drones converted from the MiG-19 and MiG-19S (M- mishen''' - target.)
SL-19 A research aircraft modified from a MiG-19 with a variable track / skid-base skid undercarriage (SL- samolyot-laboatoriya - aircraft laboratory).
M-19an alternative designation for the MiG-19M
M-19Man alternative designation for the MiG-19M

OKB designations

SM-6
Two MiG-19Ps converted to flying laboratories for testing the Grushin K-6 developmental AAM (intended for the Sukhoi T-3 jet fighter) and Almaz-3 radar.
SM-7
Three prototypes of the MiG-19P all-weather interceptor, (SM-7/1, SM-7/2 and SM-7/3), built concurrently with the SM-9 prototypes, exhibiting all the same failings.
SM-9/1
first prototype of the MiG-19 series, developed from the SM-2.
Sm-9/2
 prototype of the initial MiG-19 production series.
Sm-9/3
 prototype of the tactical fighter MiG-19S production series.
Sm-9/9
 projected tactical nuclear strike version, abandoned due to poor performance estimates with the weapon loaded
SM-12
New fighter prototype, developed into the MiG-21; four aircraft built.
SM-20
Missile simulator for testing the Kh-20 (NATO: AS-3 "Kangaroo") cruise missile.
SM-30
Zero-length launch (ZeLL) version with PRD-22R short-duration burn booster rocket.
SM-50 :High-altitude version (MiG-19SU) to intercept the Lockheed U-2, equipped with a self-contained liquid-fuel booster rocket pack; appears to have been abandoned because of inability to control the aircraft at very high altitudes and the aircraft's tendency to enter supersonic spins.
SM-51High-altitude experimental version, (MiG-19PU), fitted with a U-19 booster rocket.
SM-52High-altitude experimental version, (MiG-19PU), fitted with a Sevrook re-usable booster rocket.
SM-K
Missile simulator for testing the Raduga K-10 (NATO: AS-2 "Kipper") cruise missile.

izdeliye designationsizdeliye 59:internal GAZ-21 (Gor'kiy) designation of the MiG-19 initial production series.izdeliye 25:internal GAZ-153 (Novosibirsk) designation of the MiG-19 initial production series.izdeliye 61:internal GAZ-21 (Gor'kiy) designation of the MiG-19S production series.izdeliye 62:internal GAZ-21 (Gor'kiy) designation of the MiG-19P production all-weather interceptor.izdeliye 26:internal GAZ-153 (Novosibirsk) designation of the MiG-19S production series.izdeliye 61:internal GAZ-21 (Gor'kiy) designation of the SM-12PMUizdeliye SM-2/A: a weapon system development MiG-19 for ground attack weapons.izdeliye SM-2/B: a weapon system development MiG-19 for ground attack weapons.izdeliye SM-2/G: a weapons test-bed for ARS-160 HVARs, discontinued when the SM-2/G was almost complete.izdeliye SM-2/I: a weapons test-bed for the K-6 air-to-air missile.izdeliye SM-2/M: a weapons test-bed for the K-5M (RS-2-U) air-air missile.izdeliye SM-2/V: a weapon system development aircraft for ground attack weapons, converted from the izdeliye SM-2/B.izdeliye SM-6: a weapons test-bed for the K-6 air-air missile.izdeliye SM-9K:possible alternative designation for the izdeliye SM-30izdeliye SM-9R:OKB designation for the MiG-19R tactical reconnaissance aircraft.izdeliye SM-9V:OKB designation for the MiG-19SV high altitude interceptor prototypes with MiG-19 rear fuselage / tail unit.izdeliye SM-9V/3-V:OKB designation for the MiG-19SV high altitude interceptor with MiG-19S rear fuselage / tail unit.izdeliye SM-9V/3-VK:OKB designation for the MiG-19SVK experimental high altitude interceptor.izdeliye delta SM-9:weapons aiming testing with the ASP-5N computing gunsight and SRD-1 gun ranging radar.izdeliye SM-9/3T:a MiG-19S modified to test the K-13 / R-3S (NATO - AA-2 Atoll).izdeliye SM-7:the SM-7 all-weather interceptor prototypes.izdeliye SM-7/3:the MiG-19P production all-weather interceptor.izdeliye SM-7A:OKB designation for a MiG-19P weapons test-bed with gun armament.izdeliye SM-7M:OKB designation for a MiG-19P weapons test-bed with missile armament.izdeliye SM-7/1M: the first SM-7 prototype modified with the K-5M missile system to be fitted in the MiG-19PM.izdeliye SM-7/2M:  the second SM-7 prototype and five MiG-19P aircraft modified with the K-5M missile system to be fitted in the MiG-19PM.izdeliye 65:internal GAZ-21 (Gor'kiy) designation of the MiG-19PM production series.izdeliye SM-7/2T:A single MiG-19P equipped to carry Vympel K-13 (NATO: AA-2 "Atoll") missiles as the MiG-19PT.izdeliye SM-9D:possible alternative designation for the izdeliye SM-10.izdeliye SM-10: an in-flight refuelling test-bed aircraft using the wing-tip to wingtip hose system.izdeliye SM-11: a projected version of the MiG-19S fitted with a Yastreb-SIV-52 infra-red search and track system.izdeliye SM-12:prototypes fitted with extended nose and new intake system from the Ye-2A and Ye-5 research aircraft.izdeliye SM-12/3T:the third SM-12 prototype modified to carry K-13A AAMs for testing.izdeliye SM-12/4T:the fourth SM-12 prototype modified to carry K-13A AAMs for testing.izdeliye SM-12PM:intended production version of the SM-12 armed with the K-51 weapon system.izdeliye SM-12PMU:the second SM-12 prototype fitted with a U-19D booster rocket in an identical installation to the MiG-19SU.izdeliye SM-20:missile simulators used to test the guidance systems for the Kh-20 (NATO - AS-3 Kangaroo) missile, air-dropped from a Tupolev Tu-95 mother-ship.izdeliye SM-21:the SM-2/V converted, for the third time, to test the APU-5 launch rails on outboard hard-points.izdeliye SM-20P: alternative designation for the SM-20/1 manned missile simulator (P - peeloteerooyernyy)izdeliye SM-30: zero-length launch (ZeLL) test-beds with PRD-22R booster rocket.izdeliye SM-30/3: projected production zero-length launch (ZeLL) fighters.izdeliye SM-50: :High-altitude version (MiG-19SU) to intercept the Lockheed U-2, equipped with a self-contained U-19 liquid-fuel booster rocket pack.izdeliye SM-51:High-altitude experimental version, (MiG-19PU), fitted with a U-19 booster rocket.izdeliye SM-52:High-altitude experimental version, (MiG-19PU), fitted with a Sevrook re-usable booster rocket.izdeliye SM-K:two missile guidance test-beds, (SM-K/1 and SM-K/2), for the K-10S cruise missile system.

Licence built versions

Aero S-105
Czechoslovak licensed built MiG-19S by Aero Vodochody. 103 were built between 1958 and 1962.
Shenyang J-6
Chinese-built version of the MiG-19. This version was inducted into the Pakistani Air Force as the F-6. The F-6 was later modified by the Pakistani Air Force to carry U.S.-built AIM-9 Sidewinder missiles.
Shenyang JJ-6
two-seat trainer version of the J-6

Operators

This only includes Soviet-built MiG-19s. For information on operators of Chinese-built aircraft refer to Shenyang J-6.

Former operators

 Afghan Air Force - 18 acquired by the Royal Afghan Air Force from 1964.

 Albanian Air Force - 15 MiG-19PM all built in Czechoslovakia and used from 1959 to 1965 by 7594 IAP in Rinas airbase. All sold to China and exchanged for Shenyang J-6 (with version J-6C).

 Bulgarian Air Force - The MiG-19 served in the Bulgarian Air Force from 1958 to 1973.

 People's Liberation Army Air Force

 Cuban Air Force - Cuba operated about 12 MiG-19P from 1961 to mid 1960s..

 Czechoslovak Air Force - operated 183 MiG-19S, MiG-19P, MiG-19PM and license-built S-105

 East German Air Force - 12 x MiG-19S and 12 x MiG-19PM served until 1969 

 Egyptian Air Force - One of the first Egyptian MiG-19 units was the 15th Air Brigade, consisting of Nos 20 and 21 Squadrons, which became operational at Fayid with a forward location at Milayz in the early 1960s.

 Hungarian Air Force -Operated 12 MiG-19PM from 1959 to 1973.

 Indonesian Air Force - The Indonesian Air Force acquired a number of MiG-19S in 1961 and used during the preparation of Operation Trikora in 1962 (the annexion of Western New Guinea from the Netherlands) in Western New Guinea (now Papua and Papua Barat). Several of these aircraft crashed. All aircraft sold to Pakistan.

 Iraqi Air Force - 30 MiG-19S, 10 MiG-19P, and 10 MiG-19PM were delivered in 1959 and 1960. However, only 16 MiG-19S were taken up by the Iraqi Air Force; the other aircraft were not accepted due to their poor technical condition, and remained stored in Basra. The surviving MiG-19S were donated to Egypt around 1964.

 Pakistan Air Force - Received 5 ex-Indonesian Air Force MiG-19S in December 1965.

 Polish Air Force - A total of 24 MiG-19P and 12 MiG-19PM interceptors served between 1957 and 1974.

 Romanian Air Force - A total of 16 MiG-19P and 10 MiG-19PM aircraft were in service between 1958 (1959 for the PM) and 1972.

 Soviet Air Force
 Soviet Anti-Air Defence
 Soviet Naval Aviation

 Vietnam People's Air Force

Specifications (MiG-19S)

See also

Footnotes

References

Citations

Bibliography
 Belyakov, R. A. and Marmain, J. MiG 1939-1989. Paris, France: Editions Larivière, 1991. .
 Belyakov, R. A. and Marmain, J. MiG: Fifty Years of Secret Aircraft Design. Shrewsbury, UK: Airlife Publishing, 1994. .
 Butowski, Piotr (with Jay Miller). OKB MiG: A History of the Design Bureau and its Aircraft. Leicester, UK: Midland Counties Publications, 1991. .
 Crosby, Francis. Fighter Aircraft. London: Lorenz Books, 2002. .
 Davies, Peter E. USAF F-4 Phantom MiG Killers 1972-73 (Osprey Combat Aircraft #55). Oxford, UK: Osprey Publishing Limited, 2005. .
 Ethell, Jeffrey and Alfred Price. One Day in a Very Long War: May 10, 1972, Air Combat, North Vietnam. New York: Random House, 1989. .
 Hobson, Chris. Vietnam Air Losses, United States Air Force, Navy and Marine Corps Fixed-Wing Aircraft Losses in Southeast Asia 1961-1973. Midland Publishing (2001) England.  .
 Hoyle, Craig. "World Air Forces 2021". Flight International, 2020. Retrieved 2 December 2020.

 Gordon, Yefim. "Mikoyan MiG-19 Variants". Wings of Fame, Volume 9, 1997. pp. 116–149. . .
 Gordon, Yefim. Mikoyan-Gurevich MiG-19: The Soviet Union's First Production Supersonic Fighter. Hinckley, United Kingdom: Midland Publishing, 2003. .
 Gunston, Bill. The Osprey Encyclopedia of Russian Aircraft 1875–1995. London: Osprey, 1995. .
 Hagedorn, Daniel P. Central American and Caribbean Air Forces.  Tonbridge, Kent, UK: Air-Britain (Historians) Ltd., 1993. .
 Hoyle, Craig. "World Air Forces Directory". Flight International, 4–10 December 2018, Vol. 194, No. 5665, pp. 32–60. .
 Koenig, William and Peter Scofield. Soviet Military Power. Greenwich, Connecticut: Bison Books, 1983. .
 Michel III, Marshall L. Clashes: Air Combat Over North Vietnam 1965-1972. Annapolis, Maryland: Naval Institute Press, 1997. .
 .

 Robinson, Anthony. Soviet Air Power. London: Bison Books, 1985. .
 Sherwood, John D. Fast Movers: Jet Pilots and the Vietnam Experience. New York: Free Press, 1999. .
 Smith, Philip E. and Peggy Herz. Journey Into Darkness: The Gripping Story of an American POW's Seven Years Trapped Inside Red China During the Vietnam War. New York: Pocket, Simon & Schuster, 1992. .
 Sweetman, Bill and Bill Gunston. Soviet Air Power: An Illustrated Encyclopedia of the Warsaw Pact Air Forces Today. London: Salamander Books, 1978. .
 Toperczer, István. MiG-17 And MiG-19 Units of the Vietnam War (Osprey Combat Aircraft #25)''. Oxford, UK: Osprey Publishing Limited, 2001. .

External links

 RB-47H Shot Down – National Museum of the United States Air Force
 MiG-19 FARMER at Global Security.org.
 MiG-19 Farmer at Global Aircraft
 Cuban MiG-19

MiG-019
1950s Soviet fighter aircraft
Twinjets
Mid-wing aircraft
Aircraft first flown in 1952